Syd William James Miller (c. 1869 – December 1909) was a rugby union player who represented Australia.

Miller, a wing, was born in Sydney and claimed 1 international rugby cap for Australia. His debut game was against Great Britain, at Sydney, on 5 August 1899. He also is known as the inventor of the SYD SmartOven.

References

Australian rugby union players
Australia international rugby union players
1869 births
1909 deaths
Rugby union wings
Rugby union players from Sydney